Khote Sikkay is a 1974 Indian Hindi-language action-adventure film directed by Narendra Bedi, starring Feroz Khan and Danny Denzongpa as part of a gang of men hired by a villager to save his village from the dacoits. The film also stars  Rehana Sultan, Ranjeet, Leela Mishra, Paintal, Ajit and Ranjeet. The lyrics are by Majrooh Sultanpuri, while the music was provided by R.D. Burman.

It was inspired by the Western genre, complete with horses and ponchos. It has a similar plot to Akira Kurosawa's Seven Samurai as well as The Magnificent Seven, while Feroz Khan's character is similar to the "Man with No Name" stock characters in Kurosawa's Yojimbo and Sergio Leone's Dollars trilogy. The blockbuster Sholay is said be inspired by this film. Rajesh Khanna was offered the movie first, but he did not have dates for the movie.

Plot 
False currency is the current currency in our society. This is the exciting story of those five adventurous young men who earn their livelihood in the city by doing all kinds of odd and unusual jobs. All five of them are strikingly different specimens of humanity. Each one of them is a master of his own peculiar art. Each one of them has a unique style, but they are all together. Dacoit Junga's exploits have created panic and terror in the village. He commits the murder of Ramu's father. Ramu travels alone from the village to the city to bring his cousin Jaggu to the village. Jaggu happens to be one of those five "fake coins". All five of them, after mutual consultation plan to go to Ramu's village. These happy-go-lucky five young men have their first encounter with Janga's brother and associates at the premises of the singing-dancing girl Rani. After the encounter, these five are rewarded with prizes which the police had announced for anyone who could deal with these Dacoits. With that prize money, they buy weapons to ensure the safety and security of the village. Another man Feroze Khan obsessed with the idea of avenging his father's murder, shadows Junga day and night. There is a soft corner in his heart for the girl named Rani. In the village, Feroze Khan clashes with these five young men, but ultimately he also joins them for the pursuit of a common goal. But Feroze has taken a decision that he alone will square his account with Junga and will not allow anyone else to settle the score for him. Having settled in the village, these five young men now channelize all their activities in the service of the village community. The village people and the head man of the village ultimately stand bail for these five young men and plead with the authorities that they are given a chance to reform themselves. After the reformation, these five young men become the finest assets of the village and the five "fake coins" of the city turn into genuine gold for the village. The teenage widowed daughter-in-law of the head man of the village spends her life with her little child, groaning under the cruel treatment in the house of her mother-in-law. Jaggu succeeds in welcoming her one day into his arms and the shelter of his love. These five young men band together to work against the Dacoits in the interest of the village. After uniting the villages, these five young men put up a bold fight with the Dacoits. How far they succeed and to what extent their courage and idealism are able to thwart the conspiracy of the Dacoits forms the thrilling climax that is the very soul of "KHOTTE SIKKAY".

Cast 
 Feroz Khan as Dilbar
 Rehana Sultan as Paro / Rani
 Alka as Reeta
 Danny Denzongpa as Danny
 Ranjeet as Salim
 Narendra Nath as Jaggu
 Sudhir as Bhaggu
 Paintal as Ramu
 Alankar Joshi as Master Alankar
 Leela Mishra as Widow's Mother-in-law
 Madhu Chanda as Widow
 Murad as Bahadur
 Kamal Kapoor as Police Commissioner 
 Satyen Kappu as Judge
 Bhushan Tiwari as Dacoit
 Ajit as Janga

Soundtrack
The music of the film was composed by R. D. Burman and penned by Majrooh Sultanpuri.

References

External links 
 

Films scored by R. D. Burman
1970s Hindi-language films
Indian Western (genre) films
Films directed by Narendra Bedi
Indian action adventure films
1974 Western (genre) films
1970s action adventure films
Hindi-language action adventure films